Mitkin is a rural locality (a khutor) in Tryokhlozhinskoye Rural Settlement, Alexeyevsky District, Volgograd Oblast, Russia. The population was 2 as of 2010.

Geography 
Mitkin is located 45 km southwest of Alexeyevskaya (the district's administrative centre) by road. Trekhlozhinsky is the nearest rural locality.

References 

Rural localities in Alexeyevsky District, Volgograd Oblast